Mecklenburg County Public Schools is a school district headquartered in Boydton, Virginia, United States. It provides the public school education for students who live in Mecklenburg County.

Organization
Mecklenburg County Public Schools is governed by the Board of Education that consists of a representative of each of the nine districts within the county together with the  Superintendent, currently Mr. Paul C. Nicholas III .  Dr. Scott Worner is replacing the retiring Mr. Nicholas June 2023.

The district runs a single high school middle school complex, four elementary schools and an Alternative Education Center. As of 2010, 32,727 students were being educated.   In school year 2011-12 it had a budget of $44,239,944.  All schools have obtained Standards of Learning accreditation.

Performance
The Division was awarded five stars out of five for performance, by USA.com, and ranked 9th out of 130 divisions in Virginia.

Schools
 Mecklenburg County High School
 Mecklenburg County Middle School
 Bluestone High School - Closed 2022
 Park View High School - Closed 2022
 Bluestone Middle School - Closed 2022	
 Park View Middle School - Closed 2022
 Chase City Elementary School - opened  September 6, 1935, in 2010-11 educated around 500 students in Grades PK-5.
 Clarksville Elementary School
 LaCrosse Elementary School
 South Hill Elementary School

References

External links
 

Education in Mecklenburg County, Virginia
School divisions in Virginia